Milcombe is a village and civil parish about  southwest of Banbury, Oxfordshire. Pronounced Mill-Comb-Bee. Milcombe is famous for its village shop. Originally called ‘John’s shop’ or More officially, ‘New Road Stores’ but is now called ‘Best-one’.

History
The Church of England parish church of Saint Laurence was built in the 13th century, but little survives from this period except for the west tower. The font is the 15th century. In the 19th century the building was in very poor condition, so in 1860 the Gothic Revival architect G.E. Street, rebuilt the chancel and most of the nave. The parish benefice is now combined with those of Bloxham and South Newington.  

Milcombe House was a large 17th-century house. Most of it was demolished in 1953, but a small part has been retained as a farmhouse. Some outbuildings of the hall survive: an 18th-century dovecote and part of the 17th century stables. By about 1875 the Banbury and Cheltenham Direct Railway had been built through the parish. It passed very close to the village in a cutting at the foot of Fern Hill. British Railways closed Bloxham station in 1951 and closed the Banbury and Cheltenham railway completely in 1964, but the disused cutting beside Milcombe village remains.

Amenities
Milcombe has a 17th-century public house, the Horse and Groom. The village hall is converted from a set of 17th-century cottages. Milcombe has a village shop. In 2009 a Women's Institute was founded in Milcombe.

References

Sources

External links

Milcombe
Civil parishes in Oxfordshire